Attila Timár-Geng (25 May 1924 – 15 January 2004) was a Hungarian basketball player. He competed in the men's tournament at the 1948 Summer Olympics.

References

1924 births
2004 deaths
Hungarian men's basketball players
Olympic basketball players of Hungary
Basketball players at the 1948 Summer Olympics
Sportspeople from Szeged